The False Detour Channel is a short channel in Lake Huron, connecting the main body of the lake to the North Channel. The Canada–United States border passes roughly through the middle of the channel, which separates Michigan's Drummond Island (Chippewa County) from Ontario's Cockburn Island (Manitoulin District).

References

Bodies of water of Chippewa County, Michigan
Landforms of Manitoulin District
Canada–United States border
Lake Huron
Bodies of water of Michigan
Channels of the United States
Channels of Canada
Bodies of water of Ontario